The International Racquetball Tour (IRT) is the leading professional racquetball organization for men's competition.  It was founded in 1991 and is the successor to previous iterations of the tour by different names.  Professional Men's racquetball events have been offered since 1973.  Events are played mostly in the USA.

Mike Grisz became chief executive officer of the IRT in January 2019. He succeeded John Scott, who became chief executive officer in June 2017, when the IRT was taken over by E.J. Promotions Inc. Previously, Jason Mannino, a former pro player, served as IRT President., who succeeded Dave Negrete in 2009. Negrete was Commissioner from 2001 to 2009. Initially, Mannino continued to play on the tour during the 2009-2010 season as well as serve as the IRT's leader, but retired at the end of that season to concentrate on being IRT President.

Rules of play

IRT matches primarily use the rules as set out by USA Racquetball. IRT matches were best of five games to 11 points each beginning in 1981 with each game won by a minimum of two points (e.g., a 12-10 score can end a game, but 11-10 cannot). But in the middle of the 2017-18 season, the IRT changed its match scoring from best of 5 games to 11 points to a best of 3 games with the first 2 games to 15 points and the tie-breaker to 11. Moreover, each of the three games was win by 1 point rather than 2 points, as it was under the previous rule with games to 11 points. The rule came into effect at the start of the 2018 calendar year.

Beginning in the 2010-2011 season, the IRT has changed its service rule so that players get two opportunities to put the ball into play (two serve rule), as in tennis where players are allowed two faults before losing a point. Since the 1990s, the IRT had been using a one serve rule, so a fault serve resulted in an immediate loss of serve.

Current season

2022 (Tier 1 and Grand Slam Events)

 Note: The New York Open final was abandoned due to poor playing conditions.

Season summaries (Tier I and Grand Slam Events)

Note: The US Open Racquetball Championships began in November 1996.

Rankings at season's end

Most seasons in top 10

Year-end number 1

 1981-82:  Dave Peck
 1982-83:  Mike Yellen
 1983-84:  Mike Yellen (2)
 1984-85:  Mike Yellen (3)
 1985-86:  Mike Yellen (4)
 1986-87:  Mike Yellen (5)
 1987-88:  Ruben Gonzalez
 1988-89:  Marty Hogan
 1989-90:  Cliff Swain
 1990-91:  Mike Ray
 1991-92:  Drew Katchtik
 1992-93:  Cliff Swain (2)
 1993-94:  Cliff Swain (3)
 1994-95:  Cliff Swain (4)
 1995-96:  Sudsy Monchik
 1996-97:  Sudsy Monchik (2)
 1997-98:  Cliff Swain (5)
 1998-99:  Sudsy Monchik (3)
 1999-2000:  Sudsy Monchik (4)
 2000-01:  Sudsy Monchik (5)
 2001-02:  Cliff Swain (6)
 2002-03:  Jason Mannino
 2003-04:  Kane Waselenchuk
 2004-05:  Kane Waselenchuk (2)
 2005-06:  Kane Waselenchuk (3)
 2006-07:  Jack Huczek
 2007-08:  Rocky Carson
 2008-09:  Kane Waselenchuk (4)
 2009-10:  Kane Waselenchuk (5)
 2010-11:  Kane Waselenchuk (6)
 2011-12:  Kane Waselenchuk (7)
 2012-13:  Kane Waselenchuk (8)
 2013-14:  Kane Waselenchuk (9)
 2014-15:  Kane Waselenchuk (10)
 2015-16:  Kane Waselenchuk (11)
 2016-17:  Kane Waselenchuk (12)
 2017-18:  Rocky Carson (2)
 2018-19:  Kane Waselenchuk (13)
 2019-20:  Kane Waselenchuk (14)
 2021:  Daniel De La Rosa

References

External links

Ladies Professional Racquetball Tour

Racquetball competitions
Sports competition series